A milk bar is a local general store or cafe.

Milk bar may also refer to:

 Milk Bar, a former nightclub in London, England managed by Nicky Holloway
 Milk Bar cafe, in Algiers which was bombed during the Algerian War of Independence by Zohra Drif
 Bar mleczny, a type of Polish restaurant, which literally means "milk bar"
 Milk Bar (bakery), a US bakery chain